The 57th Infantry Regiment or (57th IR) was a regiment of the French Army, heir of the Beauvoisis Regiment. It came from a tradition carried since 1667, until dissolved in 2011. The Regiment was in an almost continuous existence since its creation: under the Kingdom of France, the First French Republic, the First French Empire and during the course of both World Wars. The 57th Infantry Regiment was often called "LES TERRIBLES" in the Grande Armée.

Infantry regiments of France